Temporal region may refer to:
 Temporal lobe, one of the four major lobes of the cerebral cortex in the brain of mammals
 Temple (anatomy), the side of the head behind the eyes